Theodore J. McLear (June 29, 1879 – April 1958) was an American wrestler who competed in the 1904 Summer Olympics. In 1904, he won a silver medal in featherweight category. He was born in Newark, New Jersey.

References

External links
 

1879 births
1958 deaths
Sportspeople from Newark, New Jersey
Wrestlers at the 1904 Summer Olympics
American male sport wrestlers
Olympic silver medalists for the United States in wrestling
Medalists at the 1904 Summer Olympics